Cnemaspis huaseesom is a species of gecko endemic to northern Thailand.

References

huaseesom
Reptiles described in 2010
Taxa named by Kirati Kunya